Andrano is a town and comune in the province of Lecce in the Apulia region of south-east Italy.

Main sights
Church of St. Andrew the Apostle
Church of St. Dominic
Spinola-Caracciolo castle

References

Cities and towns in Apulia
Localities of Salento